Leon Konitz (October 13, 1927 – April 15, 2020) was an American composer and alto saxophonist.

He performed successfully in a wide range of jazz styles, including bebop, cool jazz, and avant-garde jazz. Konitz's association with the cool jazz movement of the 1940s and 1950s includes participation in Miles Davis's Birth of the Cool sessions and his work with pianist Lennie Tristano. He was one of relatively few alto saxophonists of this era to retain a distinctive style, when Charlie Parker exerted a massive influence. Like other students of Tristano, Konitz improvised long, melodic lines with the rhythmic interest coming from odd accents, or odd note groupings suggestive of the imposition of one time signature over another. Other saxophonists were strongly influenced by Konitz, such as Paul Desmond and Art Pepper.

He died during the COVID-19 pandemic from complications brought on by the disease.

Biography

Early life 
Konitz was born on October 13, 1927, in Chicago. He was the youngest of three sons of Jewish immigrant parents. His Austrian father, Abraham, operated a laundry business in the back of which the family lived. His mother, Anna, had emigrated from Russia. The family spoke Yiddish at home and were not religiously observant. Neither of his parents were musical but were supportive of Konitz's interest in music.

At the age of eleven, inspired by Benny Goodman, Konitz received his first clarinet. He received classical training from Lou Honig who also taught Johnny Griffin and Eddie Harris. A year later, his admiration for Lester Young led him to drop the instrument in favour of the tenor saxophone. He eventually moved from tenor to alto. He received instruction on the saxophone from Santy Runyon. Konitz's early influences were big band horn players such as Johnny Hodges, Roy Eldridge, Willie Smith and Scoops Carry. He also greatly admired Louis Armstrong and credited the influence Benny Carter's solo on 'I Can't Believe that You're in Love with Me' had on him.

Career 
Konitz began his professional career in 1945 with the Teddy Powell band as a replacement for Charlie Ventura. A month later, the band broke up. Between 1945 and 1947, he worked intermittently with Jerry Wald. In 1946, he met pianist Lennie Tristano, and the two men worked together in a small cocktail bar. His next substantial work was with Claude Thornhill in 1947 with Gil Evans arranging and Gerry Mulligan as a composer.

He participated with Miles Davis in a group that had a brief booking in September 1948 and another the following year, but he also recorded with the band in 1949 and 1950; the tracks were later collected on the album Birth of the Cool (Capitol, 1957). The presence of Konitz and other white musicians in the group angered some black jazz players because many were unemployed at the time, but Davis rebuffed their criticisms.

Konitz stated he considered the group to belong to Mulligan. His debut as leader also came in 1949 with tracks collected on the album Subconscious-Lee. (Prestige, 1955). He turned down an opportunity to work with Goodman in 1949, a decision he later regretted. Parker lent him support on the day Konitz's child was born in Seattle, Washington, while he was stuck in New York City. The two were good friends, not the rivals some jazz critics made them out to be.

In the early 1950s, Konitz recorded and toured with the Stan Kenton Orchestra, but also continued to record as a leader. In 1961, he recorded Motion for Verve, with Elvin Jones on drums and Sonny Dallas on bass. This spontaneous session consisted entirely of standards. The loose trio format aptly featured Konitz's unorthodox phrasing and chromaticism.

In 1967, Konitz recorded The Lee Konitz Duets for Milestone, in configurations that were often unusual for the period (saxophone and trombone, two saxophones). The recordings drew on nearly the entire history of jazz from Louis Armstrong's "Struttin' with Some Barbecue", with valve trombonist Marshall Brown, to two free improvisation duos: one with a Duke Ellington associate, violinist Ray Nance, and one with guitarist Jim Hall.

Konitz contributed to the film score for Desperate Characters (1971). In 1981, he performed at the Woodstock Jazz Festival, which was held in celebration of the tenth anniversary of the Creative Music Studio.

Konitz worked with Dave Brubeck, Ornette Coleman, Charles Mingus, Attila Zoller, Gerry Mulligan, and Elvin Jones. He recorded trio dates with Brad Mehldau and Charlie Haden, released by Blue Note, as well as a live album recorded in 2009 at Birdland and released by ECM in 2011, with drummer Paul Motian. Konitz became more experimental as he grew older and released a number of free jazz and avant-garde jazz albums, performing with many younger musicians. He soloed on Elvis Costello's song "Someone Took The Words Away" in 2003, and his album with saxophonist/vocalist Grace Kelly was given 4 1/2 stars by Michael Jackson in Down Beat magazine.

Konitz had heart problems requiring surgery. He was scheduled to appear at Melbourne's Recital Centre in 2011 for the Melbourne International Jazz Festival, but canceled due to illness.

In August 2012, Konitz played to sell-out crowds at the Blue Note club in Greenwich Village, as part of Enfants Terribles, a collaboration with Bill Frisell, Gary Peacock, and Joey Baron. Days after his 87th birthday in 2014, he played three nights at Cafe Stritch in San Jose, California, with the Jeff Denson Trio, improvising on his favoured old standards. In 2018, his duo album Decade (Verve Records) celebrated both his 90th birthday and ten years of collaboration with pianist Dan Tepfer.

Konitz died at Lenox Hill Hospital in New York City on April 15, 2020, as a result of pneumonia brought on by COVID-19 during the pandemic in New York City.

Discography

Television appearances
SOLOS: The Jazz Sessions (2004)
Weightless – a recording session with Jakob Bro (2009)
 Public television series in the late 1950s with Warne Marsh, Billy Taylor, Bill Evans, Mundell Lowe and others.

References

Sources
Hamilton, Andy and Konitz, Lee (2007), Lee Konitz: Conversations on the Improviser's Art, University of Michigan Press, . Crafted out of numerous interviews between the author and his subject, the book describes Konitz's life and music.
Beaumont-Thomas, Ben (2020), ‘’Lee Konitz, jazz saxophonist with 75-year career, dies of coronavirus aged 92’’, The Guardian

External links
 Konitz's interview with the Smithsonian Jazz Oral History Program at the National Museum of American History
 A 1985 interview
 Lee Konitz: 12 Memorable Duets by Thierry Quénum (Jazz.com)
 Lee Konitz Trio: Live at the Village Vanguard by NPR
 French documentary of Konitz and Dan Tepfer European tour
 

1927 births
2020 deaths
American jazz alto saxophonists
American male saxophonists
Jazz alto saxophonists
Cool jazz saxophonists
Jazz musicians from Chicago
Miles Davis
Atlantic Records artists
Chesky Records artists
Enja Records artists
Milestone Records artists
Palmetto Records artists
Ponca Jazz Records artists
Prestige Records artists
SteepleChase Records artists
Verve Records artists
American people of Austrian-Jewish descent
American people of Russian-Jewish descent
Jewish American musicians
Pupils of Pran Nath (musician)
21st-century saxophonists
American male jazz musicians
Improvising Artists Records artists
Deaths from the COVID-19 pandemic in New York (state)
Sunnyside Records artists
Pirouet Records artists
Sonet Records artists
21st-century African-American people